Gottne is a locality situated in Örnsköldsvik Municipality, Västernorrland County, Sweden with 218 inhabitants in 2010.

History

Gottne has very old origins, among other things, arrowheads of flint have been found that probably dates back to the Neolithic Times (about 3,000 years before Christ).

Transportation

A few kilometers west of Gottne, there was a railway station along the Main Line Through Upper Norrland, Gottne Station, where a settlement grew. However, this expansion was discontinued when the station was closed down in 1963. The area around the former station is now known as Västra Gottne.

Population

In recent years, Gottne has become a Population declining area.

Gallery

References 

Populated places in Örnsköldsvik Municipality
Västernorrland County